The 2003 Bachu earthquake occurred on 24 February at 10:03 local time in the Xinjiang Autonomous Region in northwest China. The epicentre was located near to the town of Jiashi and Bachu County, approximately 105 km east of Kashgar and 310 km west of Aksu.

Tectonic setting
Seismic activity is common in the Bachu and the surrounding area. It occurs as a result of movement on fault systems that bound the Tien Shan mountain belt. The Tien Shan is actively evolving, as a result of far-field stresses associated with the collision of India and Eurasia. According to the moment tensor solution, the earthquake occurred on a thrust fault that dips 6° to the north, and strikes approximately east–west. Such a gentle dip angle implies that the earthquake may have occurred on or just above the basal detachment of the neighbouring fold-thrust belts. There is no evidence of oblique-slip or strike-slip movement.

Damage and casualties
It affected the counties of Bachu, Jiashi, Artux and Makit, as well as the city of Kashgar. At least 261 people died as a result of the earthquake, and more than 4,000 were injured. According to Xinhua News Agency, the quake was the most serious in the area since 1949. In the town of Chongku Qiake, the worst hit town in Bachu, every house was damaged, leaving 90 percent of the population without shelter. Most of the casualties occurred in the county, where more than 158 were killed including the elderly and children. Around 12 children in a secondary school were killed when their school collapsed. Two bodies of children were found in a primary school. Almost 71,000 homes were levelled and 40,119 others were damaged by the earthquake.  A further 5 people were killed in powerful aftershocks which occurred on 26 February 2003.

See also
List of earthquakes in 2003
List of earthquakes in China

References

External links
BBC News – "In Pictures: China earthquake"
BBC News – "China aftershocks claim more lives"
BBC News – "China quake prisoners escape injury"
M 6.3 – southern Xinjiang, China – United States Geological Survey

2003 Bachu
2003 earthquakes
February 2003 events in China
2003 disasters in China
Earthquakes in Kyrgyzstan